In scholastic philosophy, the aevum (also called aeviternity) is the temporal mode of existence experienced by angels and by the saints in heaven. In some ways, it is a state that logically lies between the eternity (timelessness) of God and the temporal experience of material beings. It is sometimes referred to as "improper eternity".

Etymology 
The word aevum is Latin, originally signifying "age", "aeon", or "everlasting time"; the word aeviternity comes from the Medieval Latin neologism aeviternitas.

History 
The concept of the aevum dates back at least to Albertus Magnus's treatise De quattuor coaequaevis. Its most familiar description is found in the Summa theologica of Thomas Aquinas. Aquinas identifies the aevum as the measure of the existence of beings that "recede less from permanence of being, forasmuch as their being neither consists in change, nor is the subject of change; nevertheless they have change annexed to them either actually, or potentially". As examples, he cites the heavenly bodies (which, in medieval science, were considered changeless in their nature, though variable in their position) and the angels, which "have an unchangeable being as regards their nature with changeableness as regards choice".

Contemporary philosophy 
Frank Sheed, in his book Theology and Sanity, said that the aevum is also the measure of existence for the saints in heaven:

References

Angels in Christianity
Concepts in metaphysics
Christian saints
Heaven in Christianity
Infinity
Philosophy of time
Scholasticism